The Fāngyán, compiled by the Han dynasty poet and philosopher Yang Xiong (53 BCE – 18 CE), was the first Chinese dictionary of regionalisms. Translations of this ancient dictionary's title include: 'regional words', 'regional expressions', 'dictionary of local expressions', and 'regional spoken words'.

Yang Xiong's Fangyan is considered the "most significant lexicographic work" of the Western Han. His dictionary's preface explains how he spent 27 years amassing and collating the dictionary. Yang collected regionalisms from many sources, particularly the yóuxuān ( 'light carriage') surveys, which were a Zhou and Qin dynasty tradition of annually sending imperial emissaries into the countryside to gather folk songs and popular sayings, which recorded localisms from all over China and as far north as Korea. The Fangyans full title is Yóuxuān shǐzhě juédài yǔ shì biéguó fāngyán''' ('Local expressions of other countries in times immemorial explained by the Light-Carriage Messenger').

 Contents Fangyan originally contained some 9,000 characters in 15 chapters (卷), but two chapters were subsequently lost.

Definitions typically list regional synonyms. For instance, chapter 8, which catalogs animal names, gives regional words for hu (虎 'tiger') in Han times.
Tiger: in the regions of Chen-Wei Song-Chu [Central China], some call it lifu; in the regions of Jiang-Huai Nan-Chu [Southern China], they call it li'er, and some call it wutu. From the Pass, east- and west-ward [Eastern and Western China], some call it also bodu.

Comparative linguists have used dialect data from the Fangyan in reconstructing the pronunciation of Eastern Han Chinese (1st century CE), which is an important diachronic stage between Old Chinese and Middle Chinese. In the above example, Paul Serruys reconstructs "tiger" as Old Chinese *blxâg.

Serruys also applied the techniques of modern dialectology to the distribution of regional words, identifying dialect areas and their relationships.

 Terminology 
Victor Mair proposed that  fāngyán be translated as topolect, while dialect should be translated into Chinese as 通言 tōngyán. Based on this, "topolect" has been used to characterize other speech varieties where an identification as either "language" or "dialect" would be controversial. Examples include Scots and the various regional varieties of Arabic and Romani. In all of these situations, an identification of distinct languages by the straightforward criterion of mutual intelligibility may not be politically or socially acceptable to a significant number of scholars. For example, several varieties of Southwestern Mandarin are not mutually intelligible, and they would be classified as distinct languages within the Mandarin branch of the Chinese (or Sinitic) language family, if it weren't for the dominant social, historical, and political concept of Chinese as a unitary language. Mandarin, Southwestern Mandarin, the mutually unintelligible varieties of Southwestern Mandarin, and indeed the mutually intelligible dialects within those varieties are all termed "topolects".

See alsoShuowen JieziList of Chinese dictionariesGreat Dictionary of Modern Chinese DialectsNotes

References

 

Further reading

 Gina Anne Tam. 2020. Dialect and Nationalism in China, 1860–1960''. Cambridge University Press.

External links

 Fangyan 方言, Chinaknowledge
 方言, text in Chinese at CText
 方言: 13卷 (粤東書局) 1873 on Google Books
 方言 at the Internet Archive

Chinese classic texts
Chinese dictionaries
Han dynasty texts
1st-century books